USS L-9 (SS-49) was an L-class submarine of the United States Navy.

Description
The L-class boats designed by Electric Boat (L-1 to L-4 and L-9 to L-11) were built to slightly different specifications from the other L boats, which were designed by Lake Torpedo Boat, and are sometimes considered a separate class. They displaced  on the surface and  submerged. The L-class submarines had a crew of 28 officers and enlisted men.

For surface running, the Electric Boat submarines were powered by two  diesel engines, each driving one propeller shaft. When submerged each propeller was driven by a  electric motor. They could reach  on the surface and  underwater.

The boats were armed with four 18-inch (450 mm)  torpedo tubes in the bow. They carried four reloads, for a total of eight torpedoes. The Electric Boat submarines were initially not fitted with a deck gun; a single 3"/50 caliber gun on a disappearing mount was added during the war.

Construction and career
L-9s keel was laid down on 2 November 1914 by Fore River Shipbuilding Company in Quincy, Massachusetts. She was launched on 27 October 1915 sponsored by Miss Heather Pattison Baxter, and commissioned on 4 August 1916. Assigned to the Atlantic Submarine flotilla, L-9 operated along the Atlantic coast until April 1917 developing new techniques of undersea warfare.

Following the United States's entry into World War I, submarines were needed to protect Allied shipping lanes to Europe.  After an extensive overhaul, preparing her for the task ahead, L-9 departed Portsmouth, Virginia, on 17 January 1918 and arrived Bantry Bay, Ireland, on 21 February. She remained in British waters throughout the war, patrolling for U-boats.

After the Armistice with Germany on 11 November, L-9 operated out of the Isle of Portland, England, until she sailed 3 January 1919 for the United States. Arriving Philadelphia, Pennsylvania, on 1 February, the submarine operated along the Atlantic coast for the next four years developing submarine warfare tactics. L-9 decommissioned at Hampton Roads, Virginia, on 4 May 1923 and was scrapped on 28 November 1933.

Notes

References

External links
 

United States L-class submarines
World War I submarines of the United States
Ships built in Quincy, Massachusetts
1915 ships